Ruck Zuck may refer to:

Ruck Zuck (EP), a 2006 remix album by industrial musical group KMFDM
Ruck Zuck (game show), a German game show that ran from 1988 to 2000
"Ruckzuck", a song by German techno musical group Kraftwerk from their 1970 eponymous debut album